Ipanica is a genus of moths of the family Noctuidae erected by George Hampson in 1908. Its only species, Ipanica cornigera, the laced day-moth, was first described by Arthur Gardiner Butler in 1886. It is found along the Australian east coast from Queensland to Tasmania.

The wingspan is about 30 mm. Adults have dark brown and white forewings. The hindwings are yellow with a broad brown margin and a brown spot in the middle.

References

Agaristinae
Monotypic moth genera